Thomas Manningham (died c. 1455), of Ardsley and Wrenthorpe, Yorkshire and Wrestlingworth, Bedfordshire, was an English politician.

He was a Member (MP) of the Parliament of England for Appleby in March 1416, Carlisle in 1419 and Bedford in December 1421. He was also justice of the peace in Bedfordshire, and also escheator of both that county and Buckinghamshire.

References

People from Leeds
People from Wrestlingworth
14th-century births
1455 deaths
15th-century English politicians
Members of Parliament for Appleby
English MPs March 1416
English MPs 1419
English MPs December 1421
English justices of the peace
Escheators